The Nome–Council Highway is a highway that runs for  between the communities of Council and Nome in the Nome Census Area of the Unorganized Borough in the U.S. state of Alaska. The road travels east from Nome, following the shore of the Bering Sea until it reaches the ghost town of Solomon. From there, the route travels northeast through the interior of the Seward Peninsula before it terminates on the south bank of the Niukluk River, south of Council. One of three highways traveling from Nome to surrounding communities, the highway is disconnected from the rest of the Alaska Highway System. The route is unpaved for its entire length and becomes impassable for automobiles in the winter outside of a short portion immediately outside of Nome. The portion of the road between Nome and Solomon is part of the Iditarod Trail and the highway passes several historic sites associated with the trail and the area's gold mining history.

The route began as a collection of informal trails connecting Nome with mining communities established on the peninsula at the beginning of the 20th century. In 1906, the Alaska Road Commission constructed a wagon road along most of the length of the trails from Nome to Council. Because of the value of the gold coming from the Council area, this road quickly became the main artery for the region and the Road Commission spent significant amounts of money improving and maintaining the route into the 1930s. However, the road had fallen below state standards by the 1960s and 70s and projects were undertaken to update the highway and replace river-crossing ferries with bridges. The road has been studied since the 1950s as part of a potential Fairbanks-Nome Highway; the expected cost of such a project has consistently prevented any development.

Route description

The Nome–Council Highway begins at a T intersection with Nome Bypass Road and Front Street; the former route travels north from the intersection and forms a partial loop around the main built-up area of Nome, while the latter extends westward from the intersection along the Nome seawall into the city. The highway travels southeastward from this intersection, parallel to the Bering Sea. For the first mile, the route passes East End Park Ponds to the north, a city park which contains the Swanberg Dredge and is an important point for bird migration. After milepost 2, the road bends northeastward around the mouth of the Nome River. On the east bank of the river, the route intersects West Fork Road, East Fork Road, and Fort Davis Road, all of which lead to the former site of Fort Davis, a U.S. Army facility operated during the Nome Gold Rush. The area now hosts scattered houses and fishing huts. The roadway returns to following the coastline for a few miles, before it bends and continues slightly inland. Along this stretch, the highway passes a few quarries. Between miles 12 and 14, the road again follows the shore, traveling around Cape Nome, a large headland.

Historic sites
There are four important landmarks that are listed in the United States National Register of Historic Places within the Nome Census Area.

|}

Major intersections

References

External links

State highways in Alaska
Transportation in Unorganized Borough, Alaska
Nome, Alaska
Nome Census Area, Alaska
Gold rush trails and roads